Joseph Daniel McGoldrick (June 5, 1901 – April 5, 1978) was an American politician and lawyer. He served as Comptroller of New York City for nearly nine years. He subsequently was the New York State Residential Rent Control Commissioner, founded a law firm, and was chairman of the Department of Political Science at Queens College for a decade.

Early life
McGoldrick was born in Brooklyn, New York. He had three younger siblings, and his parents were Loretta and Daniel McGoldrick, an accountant.

He graduated from Erasmus Hall High School. McGoldrick then attended Columbia University, graduating in 1922 with an A.B. with honors in History and Greek. He was then an instructor in government at Columbia.  He received a law degree from Fordham University in 1929. He was granted a Ph.D. from Columbia in 1931.

Career
McGoldrick in 1934 became deputy to Comptroller of New York City W. Arthur Cunningham. Cunningham died, and McGoldrick was appointed by Mayor La Guardia to take his place. McGoldrick later ran in a special election, and lost. But when La Guardia ran for a second term in 1937, McGoldrick joined him in office as Comptroller, and the same happened four years later.

After serving as comptroller he become the New York State Residential Rent Control Commissioner in 1946. In 1948 he founded the law firm of McGoldrick, Dannett, Horowitz & Golub. In 1958 he joined the Queens College faculty, where he spent a decade as chairman of the Department of Political Science.

McGoldrick was the author of The Law and Practice of Municipal Home Rule 1916‐1930 and Building Regulation in New York City, and co‐author with R. E. and M. P. Keohane of Government in Action.

He died of cancer on April 5, 1978 in Savannah, Georgia. As of 2019, he was the last Republican to have served as Comptroller of New York City.

References

External links
Joseph D. McGoldrick (November 1, 1945). "City Building and Renewal", AAPSS, Volume 242, issue 1, pages 96-100.

1901 births
20th-century American politicians
Columbia College (New York) alumni
Fordham University alumni
New York (state) Republicans
New York City Comptrollers
20th-century American lawyers
Politicians from Brooklyn
Lawyers from Brooklyn
Queens College, City University of New York faculty
Deaths from cancer in Georgia (U.S. state)
1978 deaths
Erasmus Hall High School alumni